The finals of the Men's 1500 metres Freestyle event at the 1997 FINA Short Course World Championships were held on the last day of the competition, on Sunday 20 April 1997 in Gothenburg, Sweden.

Finals

See also
1996 Men's Olympic Games 1500m Freestyle
1997 Men's European LC Championships 1500m Freestyle

References
 Results

F